The following is a list of notable events and releases of the year 1914 in Norwegian music.

Events

Deaths

Births

 February
 17 – Magne Elvestrand, pianist and harpsichordist, best known as an organist (died 1991).

 Juni 
 24 – Kari Diesen, actor and singer (died 1987).

 November 
 14 – Leif Solberg, classical composer and organist (died 2016).

See also
 1914 in Norway
 Music of Norway

References

 
Norwegian music
Norwegian
Music
1910s in Norwegian music